Malta is an unincorporated community in Bowie County, Texas, United States. According to the Handbook of Texas, the community had a population of 297 in 1990. It is part of the Texarkana metropolitan area.

History
It was named for the city of Malta, Illinois, by early settler Lynn Tucker. A post office was established in Malta in 1896 and remained in operation until the 1950s, with Jeff D. Norman as the postmaster. Its population was 243 at the start of the 20th century and remained there until it began to decline in the 1940s. There were no businesses and only 85 residents in 1985. Five years later, the population jumped to 297.

On April 30, 1954, an F3 tornado struck Malta.

Geography

Climate
The climate in this area is characterized by hot, humid summers and generally mild to cool winters. According to the Köppen Climate Classification system, Malta has a humid subtropical climate, abbreviated "Cfa" on climate maps.

Education
The Malta Independent School District serves area students.

Notable person
 D. N. Jackson, a Baptist pastor who founded the Baptist Missionary Association of America, ministered in Malta.

References

Unincorporated communities in Texas
Unincorporated communities in Bowie County, Texas
Texarkana metropolitan area